Clean technology, in short cleantech, is any process, product, or service that reduces negative environmental impacts through significant energy efficiency improvements, the sustainable use of resources, or environmental protection activities. Clean technology includes a broad range of technology related to recycling, renewable energy, information technology, green transportation, electric motors, green chemistry, lighting, grey water, and more. Environmental finance is a method by which new clean technology projects can obtain financing through the generation of carbon credits.  A project that is developed with concern for climate change mitigation is also known as a carbon project.

Clean Edge, a clean technology research firm, describes clean technology "a diverse range of products, services, and processes that harness renewable materials and energy sources, dramatically reduce the use of natural resources, and cut or eliminate emissions and wastes." Clean Edge notes that, "Clean technologies are competitive with, if not superior to, their conventional counterparts. Many also offer significant additional benefits, notably their ability to improve the lives of those in both developed and developing countries."

Investments in clean technology have grown considerably since coming into the spotlight around 2000. According to the United Nations Environment Program, wind, solar, and biofuel companies received a record $148 billion in new funding in 2007 as rising oil prices and climate change policies encouraged investment in renewable energy. $50 billion of that funding went to wind power. Overall, investment in clean-energy and energy-efficiency industries rose 60 percent from 2006 to 2007. In 2009, Clean Edge forecasted that the three main clean technology sectors, solar photovoltaics, wind power, and biofuels, would have revenues of $325.1 billion by 2018.

According to an MIT Energy Initiative Working Paper published in July 2016, about a half of over $25 billion funding provided by venture capital to cleantech from 2006 to 2011 was never recovered. The report cited cleantech's dismal risk/return profiles and the inability of companies developing new materials, chemistries, or processes to achieve manufacturing scale as contributing factors to its flop.

Clean technology has also emerged as an essential topic among businesses and companies. It can reduce pollutants and dirty fuels for every company, regardless of which industry they are in, and using clean technology has become a competitive advantage. Through building their Corporate Social Responsibility (CSR) goals, they participate in using clean technology and other means by promoting Sustainability. Fortune Global 500 firms spend around $20 billion a year on CSR activities in 2018.

Definition

Cleantech products or services are those that improve operational performance, productivity, or efficiency while reducing costs, inputs, energy consumption, waste, or environmental pollution. Its origin is the increased consumer, regulatory, and industry interest in clean forms of energy generation—specifically, perhaps, the rise in awareness of global warming, climate change, and the impact on the natural environment from the burning of fossil fuels.  Cleantech is often associated with venture capital funds and land use organizations.  The term has historically been differentiated from various definitions of green business, sustainability, or triple bottom line industries by its origins in the venture capital investment community and has grown to define a business sector that includes significant and high growth industries such as solar, wind, water purification, and biofuels.

Nomenclature
While the expanding industry has grown rapidly in recent years and attracted billions of dollars of capital, the clean technology space has not settled on an agreed-upon term. In recent years, some clean technology companies have de-emphasized that aspect of their business to tap into broader trends, such as smart cities.

Origins of the concept
The idea of cleantech first emerged among a group of emerging technologies and industries, based on principles of biology, resource efficiency, and second-generation production concepts in basic industries. Examples include: energy efficiency, selective catalytic reduction, non-toxic materials, water purification, solar energy, wind energy, and new paradigms in energy conservation. Since the 1990s, interest in these technologies has increased with two trends: a decline in the relative cost of these technologies and a growing understanding of the link between industrial design used in the 19th century and early 20th century, such as fossil fuel power plants, the internal combustion engine, and chemical manufacturing, and an emerging understanding of human-caused impact on earth systems resulting from their use (see articles: ozone hole, acid rain, desertification, climate change, and global warming).

Investment worldwide

In 2008, clean technology venture investments in North America, Europe, China, and India totaled a record $8.4 billion. Cleantech Venture Capital firms include NTEC, Cleantech Ventures, and Foundation Capital. The preliminary 2008 total represents the seventh consecutive year of growth in venture investing, widely recognized as a leading indicator of overall investment patterns. China is seen as a major growth market for cleantech investments currently, with a focus on renewable energy technologies. In 2014, Israel, Finland and the US were leading the Global Cleantech Innovation Index, out of 40 countries assessed, while Russia and Greece were last. With regards to private investments, the investment group Element 8 has received the 2014 CleanTech Achievement award from the CleanTech Alliance, a trade association focused on clean tech in the State of Washington, for its contribution in Washington State's cleantech industry.

According to the published research, the top clean technology sectors in 2008 were solar, biofuels, transportation, and wind. Solar accounted for almost 40% of total clean technology investment dollars in 2008, followed by biofuels at 11%. In 2019, sovereign wealth funds directly invested just under US$3 billion in renewable energy .

The 2009 United Nations Climate Change Conference in Copenhagen, Denmark was expected to create a framework whereby limits would eventually be placed on greenhouse gas emissions. Many proponents of the cleantech industry hoped for an agreement to be established there to replace the Kyoto Protocol. As this treaty was expected, scholars had suggested a profound and inevitable shift from "business as usual." However, the participating States failed to provide a global framework for clean technologies. The outburst of the 2008 economic crisis then hampered private investments in clean technologies, which were back at their 2007 level only in 2014. The 2015 United Nations Climate Change Conference in Paris is expected to achieve a universal agreement on climate, which would foster clean technologies development. On 23 September 2019, the Secretary-General of the United Nations hosted a Climate Action Summit in New York.

In 2022 the investment in cleantech (also called climatetech) boomed. "In fact, climate tech investment in the 12 months to Q3 2022 represented more than a quarter of every venture dollar invested, a greater proportion than 12 of the prior 16 quarters."

Implementation worldwide 
India is one of the countries that have achieved remarkable success in sustainable development by implementing clean technology, and it became a global clean energy powerhouse. India, who was the third-largest emitter of greenhouse gases, advanced a scheme of converting to renewable energy with sun and wind from fossil fuels. This continuous effort has created an increase in the country's renewable energy capacity (around 80 gigawatts of installed renewable energy capacity, 2019), with a compound annual growth rate of over 20%. By steadily increasing India's renewable capacity, India is achieving the Paris Agreement with a significant reduction in producing carbon emissions. Adopting renewable energy not only brought technological advances to India, but it also impacted employment by creating around 330,000 new jobs by 2022 and more than 24 million new jobs by 2030, according to the International Labour Organization in the renewable energy sector.

Germany has been one of the renewable energy leaders in the world, and their efforts have expedited the progress after the nuclear power plant meltdown in Japan in 2011, by deciding to switch off all 17 reactors by 2022. Still, this is just one of Germany's ultimate goals; and Germany is aiming to set the usage of renewable energy at 80% by 2050, which is currently 47% (2020). Also, Germany is investing in renewable energy from offshore wind and anticipating its investment to result in one-third of total wind energy in Germany. The importance of clean technology also impacted the transportation sector of Germany, which produces 17 percent of its emission. The famous car-producing companies, Mercedes-Benz, BMW, Volkswagen, and Audi, in Germany, are also providing new electric cars to meet Germany's energy transition movement.

Africa and the Middle East has drawn worldwide attention for its potential share and new market of solar electricity. Notably, the countries in the Middle East have been utilizing their natural resources, an abundant amount of oil and gas, to develop solar electricity. Also, to practice the renewable energy, the energy ministers from 14 Arab countries signed a Memorandum of Understanding for an Arab Common Market for electricity by committing to the development of the electricity supply system with renewable energy.

United Nations: Sustainable Development Goals 

The United Nations has set goals for the 2030 Agenda for Sustainable Development, which is called "Sustainable Development Goals" composed of 17 goals and 232 indicators total. These goals are designed to build a sustainable future and to implement in the countries (member states) in the UN. Many parts of the 17 goals are related to the usage of clean technology since it is eventually an essential part of designing a sustainable future in various areas such as land, cities, industries, climate, etc.

 Goal 6: "Ensure availability and sustainable management of water and sanitation for all"
 Various kinds of clean water technology are used to fulfill this goal, such as filters, technology for desalination, filtered water fountains for communities, etc.
 Goal 7: "Ensure access to affordable, reliable, sustainable and modern energy for all"
 Promoting countries for implementing renewable energy is making remarkable progress, such as:
 "From 2012 to 2014, three quarters of the world’s 20 largest energy-consuming countries had reduced their energy intensity — the ratio of energy used per unit of GDP. The reduction was driven mainly by greater efficiencies in the industry and transport sectors. However, that progress is still not sufficient to meet the target of doubling the global rate of improvement in energy efficiency."
 Goal 11: "Make cities and human settlements inclusive, safe, resilient and sustainable"
 By designing sustainable cities and communities, clean technology takes parts in the architectural aspect, transportation, and city environment. For example:
 Global Fuel Economy Initiative (GFEI) - Relaunched to accelerate progress on decarbonizing road transport. Its main goal for passenger vehicles, in line with SDG 7.3, is to double the energy efficiency of new vehicles by 2030. This will also help mitigate climate change by reducing harmful  emissions.
 Goal 13: "Take urgent action to combat climate change and its impacts*"
 Greenhouse gas emissions have significantly impacted the climate, and this results in a rapid solution for consistently increasing emission levels. United Nations held the "Paris Agreement" for dealing with greenhouse gas emissions mainly within countries and for finding solutions and setting goals.

See also
Environmental science
Environmental technology
Green chemistry
Greentech
Renewable energy commercialization
Sustainable engineering
 WIPO GREEN

References

External links
Investing: Green technology has big growth potential, Los Angeles Times, 2011
The Global Cleantech Innovation Index 2014, by Cleantech Group and WWF

Economics of sustainability
Environmental technology